VASP Flight 210 was a domestic flight from Guarulhos to Belo Horizonte, Brazil operated by São Paulo-based Viação Aérea São Paulo (VASP). On 28 January 1986 it ran off the end of the taxiway from which it mistakenly tried to take off, and collided with an embankment, killing one passenger and injuring nine others.

Aircraft 
The aircraft involved in the accident was a Boeing 737-2A1, tail number PP-SME, that was 16 years and 7 months old. It had its first flight on July 16, 1969. The aircraft was powered by two Pratt & Whitney JT8D-7 turbofan engines.

Accident 
On 28 January 1986, dense fog covered the São Paulo/Guarulhos International Airport. The pilots inadvertently lined up with the taxiway instead of runway 09L. At 07:32 the aircraft ran off the end of the taxiway and hit a dyke, breaking the front end of the fuselage off, and crumpling the cockpit. One passenger was killed, and the aircraft was written off.

Cause 
A combination of intense fog, and pilot's lack of knowledge with the new airport setup caused the crash. A large factor in the incident was also the lack of ground radar and taxiway vehicles.

See also 
 Comair Flight 5191 - A similar accident involving a CRJ100 taking off from the wrong runway
 Singapore Airlines Flight 006 - A similar accident involving a Boeing 747 trying to take off from the wrong runway

References

Aviation accidents and incidents in 1986
Aviation accidents and incidents in Brazil
Accidents and incidents involving the Boeing 737 Original